Edward Burgh, 2nd Baron Burgh of Gainsborough (pronounced: Borough; c. 1463 – 20 August 1528) de jure 4th Baron Strabolgi, was an English peer.

Life
Edward Burgh was born in 1461 to Sir Thomas Burgh, 1st Baron Burgh in Lincolnshire and Margaret de Ros. He was knighted at Stoke Field in 1487. He succeeded to the title of 2nd Lord Burgh, of Gainsborough [E., 1487] on the death of his father in 1495, although he was never called to Parliament under this writ. In 1510, he was found to be a lunatic, and as such, was never called to Parliament. His mother's family, the Ros family, apparently contained the genetic seeds of insanity which incessant intermarriage spread through the Lincolnshire gentry. Lord Ros of Hamlake, Lord Burgh and his brother-in-law, Sir George Tailboys, all of whom had Ros ancestry, were confirmed lunatics.

Marriage
His first marriage, at the age of 13, was to the 9 year old heiress, Anne Cobham (daughter of Sir Thomas, de jure 5th Baron Cobham of Sterborough and Lady Anne Stafford) who had been "affianced" to the recently deceased Edward Blount, 2nd Baron Mountjoy: she brought him ownership of Sterborough Castle. Anne Cobham succeeded to the title of 6th Baroness Cobham de jure in 1471. They had two known children: Thomas and Sir Henry Burgh.

It had been thought that the 2nd Baron married Catherine Parr, who went on to become the sixth wife of Henry VIII, in 1529, when she was age seventeen, but the 2nd Baron died in August 1528. It is now accepted through recent research of documents and the will of Catherine Parr's mother by biographers Susan E. James, Linda Porter, and David Starkey that she married the 2nd Baron's grandson, who shared his first name.  Sir Edward Burgh was the eldest son of the 2nd Baron's eldest son, Sir Thomas Burgh, who would become the 1st Baron by a new creation in 1529. In her will, dated May 1529, Maud Parr, mentioned Sir Thomas, father of Edward, saying I am indebted to Sir Thomas Borough, knight, for the marriage of my daughter. At the time of his son's marriage, Thomas, was thirty-five which would have made Edward around Catherine's age. Edward was in his twenties and may have been in poor health. Sir Edward Burgh died in the spring of 1533, never fulfilling the title of Lord Burgh.

Death and succession
On the death of the 2nd Baron in 1528, his title passed to his eldest son Sir Thomas Burgh who was created and summoned to Parliament as 1st Lord Burgh of Gainsborough [England by writ] on 2 December 1529. In 1529, Edward's other son, Henry, married Katherine Neville, daughter of Sir Ralph Neville and Anne Warde. Henry and Katherine had one daughter, Anne Burgh, wife of Sir Ralph Vaughan.

Ancestry

References

See also
 Hubert de Burgh, 1st Earl of Kent (c.1170–1243) English nobleman and ancestor of the Burghs of Gainsborough

1460s births
1528 deaths
15th-century English people
16th-century English nobility
Barons Burgh
Edward
Edward
People from Gainsborough, Lincolnshire